Dubai Majesty (foaled March 19, 2005) is a retired Champion racemare best known for winning the 2010 Breeders' Cup Filly & Mare Sprint and being the only two-time winner of the Winning Colors Stakes.

Background 
Dubai Majesty is a dark bay nearly black mare sired by Essence of Dubai, whose sire was Pulpit. Her dam Great Majesty's descendants include U. S. Racing Hall of Fame inductee Ta Wee.

Career

2-3-year-old-season 
Dubai Majesty only had 1 victory as a two-year-old, but as a 3-year-old she began to run in stakes race company starting with a second-place finish in the Azalea Stakes at Florida's Calder Race Course. She then ran third in the Raven Run Stakes at Keeneland as well as in the Indiana Oaks at Hoosier Park.

4-year-old-season 
After a second-place finish, Dubai Majesty won the Franklin County Stakes at Keeneland start the 2009 season. Trainer Bret Calhoun them moved her up to G1 stakes races and she finished fourth in the Vinery Madison Stakes and  third place in the Humana Distaff Handicap. After that, she got the first of her two victorys in the Winning Colors Stakes. Winning once in her next four starts, Dubai Majesty's four-year-old season was over.

5-year-old season 
After four straight defeats, Dubai Majesty went on to repeat in the Winning Colors Stakes before a third-place result in the Princess Rooney Handicap. She then won a non-graded stakes race and followed that with a second in the G3 Presque Isle Downs Masters Stakes. Her last two races would be her best wins as she won the 2010 Raven Run Stakes. In her last start before being retired Dubai Majesty won the Breeders' Cup Filly & Mare Sprint, held that year on November 5 at Churchill Downs. Two days later she was sold at the Fasig-Tipton stock sale for $1.1 million.

Broodmare Record

Shahryar, her fourth foal to Deep Impact won the 2021 Japan Derby.

Pedigree

References 

2005 racehorse births
American racehorses
Racehorses bred in Florida
Breeders' Cup Filly & Mare Sprint winners
Thoroughbred family 2-s